Pan Wenhua (16 October 1886 – 16 November 1950), courtesy name Zhongsan (仲三) was a Kuomintang general from Sichuan.

Biography
Born in Renshou County, Sichuan in 1885, Pan was the Command of the 28th Division of the National Revolutionary Army in the Second Sino-Japanese War. In the winter of 1944 he secretly joined the China Democratic League, maintaining frequent contact with top-ranking Chinese Communists such as Mao Zedong, Zhou Enlai, Wang Ruofei (王若飞), etc. He died of natural causes in Chengdu. His daughter, was called a princess when living in qionqing

1880s births
1950 deaths
National Revolutionary Army generals from Sichuan
People from Meishan